Maahefun is a celebration marking the beginning of Ramadan, where Muslims in the Maldives celebrate the taking of their last meal before beginning the month-long fasting.

References

Islam in the Maldives